Belsito is a town and comune in the province of Cosenza in the Calabria region of southern Italy. It is located of the coast the Tyrrhenian Sea.

References

Cities and towns in Calabria